Francis Alan Jackson  (2 October 1917 – 10 January 2022) was a British organist and composer who served as Director of Music at York Minster for 36 years, from 1946 to 1982.

Personal life and family
Born in Malton, North Yorkshire, Jackson was the son of William Altham Jackson (1888-1944), an engineer and sanitary inspector, and Eveline May Suddaby (1889-1974), who both sang in the local church choir. He was a first cousin once removed of the lyric soprano Elsie Suddaby, who, like him, studied with Sir Edward Bairstow.

Jackson married Priscilla Procter, who died in 2013 at the age of 95. They had three children: Alice, William and Edward.

He turned 100 in October 2017, and the occasion was marked by a special concert during that year's Ryedale Festival. He died on 10 January 2022 at the age of 104. His last visit to York Minster was in 2021, to see the newly-restored organ following its £2 million refurbishment.

Career and legacy

Jackson had been a chorister at St Michael's Church, Malton, along with his brother Paul, until he joined the choir of York Minister in 1929, where he sang under Sir Edward Bairstow for four years, after which he returned to Malton to serve as organist at St Michael's from 1933 to 1940. He studied at Durham University and became a Fellow of the Royal College of Organists (FRCO) in 1937, winning the Limpus Prize. After active service during the Second World War he returned to York Minster in 1946 to become Organist and Director of Music, succeeding Bairstow. He held this post for 36 years. After his retirement in 1982, he was appointed Organist Emeritus.

In 1961 Jackson played for the wedding of Elizabeth II's cousin, Prince Edward, Duke of Kent, to Katherine Worsley. The final voluntary was the Toccata from Widor's Symphony for Organ No. 5, which set the fashion for the use of this piece for weddings.

From 1972 to 1974 he served as President of the Royal College of Organists. He was appointed an Officer of the Order of the British Empire (OBE) for services to music in 1978 and a Commander (CBE) in 2007. He was also recognised with many academic degrees and awards throughout his lifetime.

After his retirement, Jackson and his wife retired to the Ryedale village of Acklam, where they had bought a house in 1954, and for many years he gave recitals in the surrounding area.

Jackson was the mentor of Oscar-winning film composer John Barry.

Compositions and recordings
Jackson gave recitals and concerts all over the world and made numerous recordings of solo organ music and of choral music with the choir of York Minster. His extensive output of sacred and secular music includes canticles, anthems, hymn tunes (including the widely sung "East Acklam"), organ sonatas and other organ pieces such as "Diversion for Mixtures", but his 164 opus numbers range well beyond choral and solo organ music. There are two acclaimed monodramas – Daniel in Babylon and A Time of Fire - as well as the overture Brigantia, an organ concerto (1985), a symphony (1957), chamber music and solo songs. 

Jackson's creative output continued after his retirement. He recorded four CDs of his own organ music for Priory Records, and the organ concerto in 1999. Two CDs of his choral works have also be published.

Writing
Jackson was the author of a biography of his teacher, mentor and predecessor, Sir Edward Bairstow, entitled Blessed City: The Life and Works of Sir Edward C. Bairstow. His autobiography, Music For A Long While, was published in 2013.

Key events
1929-1933: Chorister at York Minster under Edward Bairstow
1933-1940: Organist of Malton Parish Church
1937: Gained FRCO with the Limpus Prize
1946-1982: Organist of York Minster
1957: Gained DMus Durham University
1970: Became Fellow of Westminster Choir College, Princeton, New Jersey
1972-1974: President of the Royal College of Organists
1978: Appointed OBE for services to music.
1982: On retiring from York Minster in 1982 he received the Fellowship of the Royal Northern College of Music, the Doctorate of the University of York and, at the hands of the Archbishop of York, Lord Blanch, the Order of Saint William of York.
2007: Promoted to CBE in the Queen's birthday honours for services to music.
2012: Received the Lambeth degree of DMus (Cantuar) from  Archbishop of Canterbury
2012: Awarded the inaugural Medal of the Royal College of Organists "for organ playing, organ and choral composition, and choral conducting."
2020: Honorary Fellow of the Burgon Society.

References

External links
 Francis Jackson in conversation with Simon Lindley
 Francis Jackson compositions at Banks Music 
 Obituary: Daily Telegraph 15 Jan 22
 
 

1917 births
2022 deaths
People from Malton, North Yorkshire
20th-century British male musicians
20th-century organists
21st-century British male musicians
21st-century organists
British male organists
Cathedral organists
Classical composers of church music
Composers for pipe organ
English classical composers
English classical organists
English male classical composers
Alumni of Durham University
Commanders of the Order of the British Empire
Fellows of the Royal College of Organists
Recipients of the Medal of the Royal College of Organists
Holders of a Lambeth degree
British centenarians
Men centenarians
Male classical organists